DestaGlobal started as an Indian startup technology company working in agriculture sector. The name ‘Desta’ is derived from an Amharic term which means happiness. The organisation was founded in 2010 by Ron Boehm, Marlys Boehm and Nishant Banore.

History & funding 
DestaGlobal is a social impact organization working on the Agri-input distribution space contributing to income and livelihood of farmers. The organisation focuses on distributing a wide portfolio of products to the farmers at the right price point.

In 2010, DestaGlobal acquired $2 Mn from the US-based investor Boma Investments LLC in order to expand its products to farmers in Maharashtra. Over the years, the organisation works extensively with farmers, dealers, distributors and Agri Manufacturers existing in overall 36 districts of Maharashtra.

The organisation connects around 2.5 lakh farmers, 2,000 dealers and 130 agri input manufacturers in rural Maharashtra.

In 2015, technology became the focus of the organisation extending towards the rural hinterland.

The organisation outstripped inferior marketing and distribution mediums of agri-inputs establishing an e-commerce portal & a web dashboard for dealers. In 2018 & 2019 the organisation extended the tech platform to farmers and dealers by launching mobile applications with an objective to offer schemes on thousands of products available on the e-commerce portal.

Organizational structure 
DestaGlobal was founded in 2010 by Ron Boehm, Marlys Boehm & Nishant Banore. Siddhartha Choudhary is heading the business as CEO of the company.

Products and services 
The organisation focuses on Agri-products such as seeds, pesticides, fertilizers, plant growth regulators, animal husbandry products. The organisation expanded the product portfolio including Agricultural equipments such as farm machinery, drip irrigation products, solar energy products & Other allied Products. The organisation also encourages organic farming assisting organic manures & organic products.

DestaGlobal estimated, that technology could save $16 for every farmer today. With a million farmers on the system, and sellers looking to extend better schemes, these savings could go up to $35 per farmer. Consequently, farmers would get a 2-3 percent better margin on their efforts thereby saving as much as $2 billion for India's farming community per annum.

Destaglobal via Technology launched services such as :

DestaMart 
A B2B e-commerce portal was launched in June 2015. The organisation assembled this platform as a medium for the agri-input suppliers and agri-stores i.e. retailers at the village/district level focusing on the efficiency of agri-inputs supply chain.

Web Dashboard 
The organisation launched a web dashboard for dealers offering business insights & advanced market flow.

DestaTalk 
This agri-info portal renders information on streaming agricultural techniques and products and agribusiness.

Siddhi Kisan App 
An Android-based application was launched in July 2018 retaining farmers adversity.  This application offers agri-materials' to farmers at discounted rates in conjunction with a networking platform, a knowledge section and loyalty section.

Siddhi Dealer App 
The organisation launched an Android-based application for dealers in the year 2019. This Android-based application offers a platform for Ag-Dealers providing proper analysis of dealers’ business insights & advanced market flow.

Activities

Desta Krushi Parivar 
In May 2015, DestaTalk organized online photography contest. About 168 photographs were submitted for this contest.

Desta Mela 
On December 22, 2015, the organisation formulated an event for the local farmers of Palghar District, Maharashtra providing information on the latest farming products and innovative technology. Agricultural products such as plant growth regulator, mulching paper, manure and solar lamp were on display for farmers.

Desta Career Stall 
The organisation hosted a programme to recruit local talents and train them for better job opportunities accompanying a tie-up with local agriculture universities, in order to provide information on pre-education and career opportunities contributing to the welfare of farmers' children's.

Awards

Top 50 Tech Companies Award 
DestaGlobal was selected as one of the 'Top 50 Tech Companies' at InterCon 2019, Dubai.

Rural Activation of the Year 
Organization was awarded with "Rural Activation of the Year" at WOW Awards Asia 2019 for its campaign named "Building a decentralized and self-sustaining agri-ecosystem".

RMAI Flame Awards Asia 2019 
In 2019, company was won award in two distinct categories namely "Best Use of Mobile" and "Rural Innovation of The Year" at RMAI Flame Awards Asia 2019.

Rural Innovation of The Year 
The organisation also won the "Rural Innovation Of The Year" Award at RMAI Flame Awards 2018 for campaign "Tech-solution To Connect Ag-manufacturer, Ag-dealer & Farmer With Each Other."

Special Mention Award 
DestaTalk the subsidiary agricultural information website of the organisation won the "Special Mention Award" at Social Media for Awareness Summit - 2016 organized by Digital Empowerment Foundation.

References

External links 

Official website
E-commerce portal
Agri-info portal

Indian companies established in 2010
Agriculture companies of India
2010 establishments in Maharashtra